The 42nd Los Angeles Film Critics Association Awards, given by the Los Angeles Film Critics Association (LAFCA), honored the best in film for 2016.

Winners

Best Picture:
Moonlight
Runner-up: La La Land
Best Director:
Barry Jenkins – Moonlight
Runner-up: Damien Chazelle – La La Land
Best Actor:
Adam Driver – Paterson
Runner-up: Casey Affleck – Manchester by the Sea
Best Actress:
Isabelle Huppert – Elle and Things to ComeRunner-up: Rebecca Hall – ChristineBest Supporting Actor:
Mahershala Ali – MoonlightRunner-up: Issey Ogata – SilenceBest Supporting Actress:Lily Gladstone – Certain WomenRunner-up: Michelle Williams – Manchester by the SeaBest Screenplay:Yorgos Lanthimos and Efthimis Filippou – The LobsterRunner-up: Kenneth Lonergan – Manchester by the SeaBest Cinematography:James Laxton – MoonlightRunner-up: Linus Sandgren – La La LandBest Editing:Bret Granato, Maya Mumma, and Ben Sozanski – O.J.: Made in AmericaRunner-up: Tom Cross – La La LandBest Production Design:Ryu Seong-hee – The HandmaidenRunner-up: David Wasco – La La LandBest Music Score:Justin Hurwitz, Benj Pasek, and Justin Paul – La La LandRunner-up: Mica Levi – JackieBest Foreign Language Film:The Handmaiden • South KoreaRunner-up: Toni Erdmann • GermanyBest Documentary/Non-Fiction Film:I Am Not Your NegroRunner-up: O.J.: Made in AmericaBest Animation:Your NameRunner-up: The Red TurtleNew Generation Award:Trey Edward Shults and Krisha Fairchild – KrishaCareer Achievement Award:Shirley MacLaineThe Douglas Edwards Experimental/Independent Film/Video Award:Deborah Stratman – The Illinois ParablesSpecial Citation:'''
Turner Classic Movies

References

External links
 42nd Annual Los Angeles Film Critics Association Awards

2016
Los Angeles Film Critics Association Awards
Los Angeles Film Critics Association Awards
Los Angeles Film Critics Association Awards
Los Angeles Film Critics Association Awards